T1 (previously known as SK Telecom T1 or SKT T1) is a South Korean esports organization operated by the T1 Entertainment & Sports, a joint venture between SK Telecom and Comcast Spectacor. At the end of 2003, SK Telecom took the StarCraft Team Orion (formerly 4U) by Lim Yo-hwan under contract and set up the team under the conglomerate's banner. Lim Yo-hwan took the role of team captain. T1's League of Legends team has won the 2013, 2015, and 2016 editions of the League of Legends World Championship.

League of Legends

SK Telecom T1 K 

SKT 2 won their first League of Legends World Championship. In 2014, SK Telecom T1 K followed their success through in the OGN winter season, winning the tournament without dropping a single game. They would then go on to win All-Star Paris 2014. However, their Winter season success did not follow through and after the Spring and Summer seasons, SKT T1 K failed to qualify for the 2014 World Championship. In the following offseason, Riot Games changed the team regulations so that each organizations may only have one team participating in each league. This led to the merger of SKT T1 K and SKT T1 S, and the subsequent departures of Impact and Piglet for the NA LCS. The new team would compete under the name SKT T1.

SK Telecom T1 
At the 2015 World Championship, SKT won while only dropping one game in the finals for a record of 15–1 throughout the tournament.

SKT team started off the 2016 Season by winning the LCK Spring Split. With this victory, SKT was guaranteed a spot in the 2016 Mid-Season Invitational. At that point in time, MSI was the only major international tournament they had yet to win. They were heavily favored coming into the tournament, but were initially unable to perform up to their usual standards, unexpectedly losing several games in the group stage. However, they managed to turn things around during the elimination round and eventually clinched the title by sweeping the North American team, Counter Logic Gaming, in the finals. SKT placed third in the 2016 LCK Summer Split, but still qualified for the 2016 World Championship through circuit points. The team swept through the group stage and advanced towards the playoff round. In the semifinals they defeated the ROX Tigers in a close 3–2 series. In the finals they defeated Samsung Galaxy in another close 3–2 series, winning their third world championship title. Faker was voted as the Most Valuable Player of the tournament.

SKT won the 2017 LCK Spring Split, clean sweeping KT Rolster 3–0 in the finals. This win qualified them for the 2017 Mid-Season Invitational. At the 2017 Mid-Season Invitational, SKT topped the group stage with a 8–2 record. SKT then swept Flash Wolves 3–0 in the semifinals and defeated G2 Esports 3–1 in the finals, becoming the first team to win the Mid-Season Invitational back-to-back. At the 2017 World Championship, SKT were considered to be strong favourites to lift the cup for a third consecutive time despite not winning the LCK Summer Split. After a 5–1 group stage, SKT narrowly defeated Misfits and Royal Never Give Up in the quarterfinals and semifinals, respectively, before facing Samsung Galaxy in a repeat of the previous year's final. Despite being favourites going into the game, Samsung Galaxy swept SKT 3–0, ending their domination at the World Championship.

SKT finished fourth in the 2018 Korea Regional Finals, failing to qualify for the 2018 World Championship.

In April 2019, SKT won the LCK Spring Split. As champions, SKT represented the LCK at the 2019 Mid-Season Invitational. They finished the group stage in second place but lost 3–2 to G2 Esports in the semifinals. In the LCK Summer Split, SKT repeated the success and defended their title. SKT qualified as the LCK's first seed for the 2019 League of Legends World Championship, where they were once again defeated by G2 Esports in a semifinals series, losing 3–1.

T1 
In October 2019, SKT rebranded as T1 after partnering with Comcast Spectacor. In February 2020, Faker had re-signed with the team for three years, in which his contract would last until 2022. He also became a part owner of T1 Entertainment and Sports. In April of the same year, T1 defeated Gen.G and won their ninth LCK title.

At the 2021 League of Legends World Championship, T1 was eliminated in the semifinals by DWG KIA, losing 3–2 in a best-of-five series.

During the 2022 LCK Spring, T1 went undefeated in the regular season with an 18–0 record, becoming the first team to achieve this record since the league's inception. In the playoffs, T1 won its tenth LCK title, defeating Gen.G 3–1 in the finals. On the international stage, T1 finished as the runners-up of the 2022 Mid-Season Invitational, losing in the final to Royal Never Give Up. The team also finished as the runners-up at the 2022 League of Legends World Championship after losing 3–2 to DRX in the final. The team had qualified for the tournament as the second seed from the LCK by the virtue of having the most Championship Points.

Tournament results

As SK Telecom T1 S

As SK Telecom T1 K

As SK Telecom T1 / T1

Honours

Domestic

League
 League of Legends Champions Korea
Winners (10): 2013 Summer, 2013–14 Winter, 2015 Spring, 2015 Summer, 2016 Spring, 2017 Spring, 2019 Spring, 2019 Summer, 2020 Spring, 2022 Spring
Runners-up (3): 2017 Summer, 2021 Summer, 2022 Summer

International
League of Legends World Championship
Winners (3): 2013, 2015, 2016
Runners-up: 2017, 2022

Mid-Season Invitational
Winners (2): 2016, 2017
Runners-up: 2015, 2022

Intel Extreme Masters 
Winners: 2016

Roster

StarCraft

Tournament results

StarCraft I

StarCraft II

Other rosters

Valorant

Overwatch

Wild Rift

Super Smash Bros. Ultimate

Awards and nominations

Literature

Notes

References

External links 

Official website

T1 (esports)
2003 establishments in South Korea
Esports teams based in South Korea
Telecom T1
Esports teams established in 2003
StarCraft teams
League of Legends Champions Korea teams
Fighting game player sponsors
Super Smash Bros. player sponsors
Overwatch League academy teams
Dota teams
Valorant teams